Tomas Andros (1 May 1759 Norwich, Connecticut – 30 December 1845 Berkley, Massachusetts) was an American clergyman.

He joined the revolutionary army at the age of 16, and fought in the battles of Long Island and White Plains. In 1781 he enlisted on a privateer in New London, but was captured and confined in the Jersey prison-ship in New York. A few months later he escaped, and on the restoration of his health studied theology with Benedict in Plainfield, Connecticut.

He was ordained at Berkley in 1788, and for 46 years remained in charge of the church at this place. He published sermons, and also a narrative of his imprisonment and escape from the Jersey prison-ship. An account of his life, prepared by his son, is given in Emery's "Ministry of Taunton."

His son, R. S. S. Andros, was born in Berkley, Massachusetts, and died there in August 1868. He edited several newspapers, was deputy collector in Boston for some years, and subsequently, as special agent of the treasury department, was engaged in reorganizing custom-houses in the South. He was the author of the "Customs Guide," a codification of the revenue laws, contributed poems to the " Democratic Review," and published "Chocorua and other Sketches" (1838).

References 

This article incorporates text from the 2001 online edited version of Appleton's Cyclopedia of American Biography with the permission of Virtuaology.com. It is a stub and you can help Wikipedia by expanding it.

1759 births
1845 deaths
American Christian clergy
18th-century Christian clergy
19th-century Christian clergy
American sermon writers
Religious leaders from Norwich, Connecticut
People from Berkley, Massachusetts
19th-century American clergy
18th-century American clergy